Virgenes is a former settlement in Los Angeles County, California. It lay at an elevation of 932 feet (284 m). It was located near Thousand Oaks, California.

See also
Rancho Las Virgenes

References

Former settlements in Los Angeles County, California
Former populated places in California